Ranveer Ching Returns is a 2016 Indian Hindi-language short action comedy film directed by Rohit Shetty. The film stars Ranveer Singh and Tamannaah.

Plot 

A man lands in a place where people are suffering from food shortage and helps them to fight hunger with Ching's Chinese products.

Cast 
 Ranveer Singh as Ranveer Ching and Ranveer Ching's mother
 Tamannaah as Ranveer Ching's love interest
 Rajesh Anandan
 Naushad Abbas
 Pradeep

Production 

In May 2016, Rohit Shetty revealed that he was going to direct a new film with Ranveer Singh and Tamannaah. But later he revealed that it was not a full-length film and officially announced that it was a short film for about 6 minutes (Approximately). In July 2016, The leading actors confirmed that the shooting was completed and titled as Ranveer Ching Returns.

Marketing 

Release 
Ranveer Ching Returns was officially released on 19 August 2016 in most cinemas and YouTube.

See also
 Ching's Secret

References

External links 
 

2010s Hindi-language films
Indian short films
Films directed by Rohit Shetty